Breakbeat Kaos is a British independent record label based in London, UK that specialises in drum and bass. It is jointly owned by Fresh and Adam F, who founded the label in 2003 by merging Fresh's Breakbeat Punk with Adam F's Kaos Recordings. The label's first release was a 12" double A-side single by Fresh titled "Dalicks / Temple of Doom". The following year the label released the single "Another Planet / Voyager" by Pendulum, which peaked at number one in the UK Dance Chart. They also produced their first full-length release with the compilation album Jungle Sound: The Bassline Strikes Back!.

Starting in 2005, Breakbeat Kaos has released studio album debuts from Pendulum, Fresh and J Majik & Wickaman. The first of these, the Pendulum album Hold Your Colour, was later certified gold, exceeding 225,000 sales in the UK alone. The label has also released singles by artists including Baron, who has gone on to score action sports films in the United States, Chase & Status, D.Kay and Future Prophecies. Since its foundation, Breakbeat Kaos has released 31 singles and four albums from more than thirteen artists, in addition to fourteen singles released through its sublabels, Under Construction and Dogs on Acid.

The label has also spawned a thriving online community of fans and producers through the medium of the Dogs on Acid forums. These forums have been used by various people associated with the label, including Pendulum and Adam F, in order to communicate with their target audience.

Breakbeat Kaos stopped releasing music in 2012, but in 2018 the label was brought back into operation.

Discography

Albums

Singles

Sublabels

Dogs on Acid

Under Construction

External links
 Breakbeat Kaos
 Dogs on Acid

References 

General
Breakbeat Kaos discography. rolldabeats. Retrieved on 7 May 2009.
Dogs on Acid discography. rolldabeats. Retrieved on 7 May 2009.
Under Construction discography. rolldabeats. Retrieved on 7 May 2009.
Specific

Drum and bass record labels